Neminath Jain Temple, originally known as Karnavihara, is a Jain temple dedicated to Jain Tirthankara Neminatha on Girnar hill near Junagadh in Gujarat, India. The temple is the largest and principal among the Girnar Jain temples. The oldest part of the present temple was built in 1129 CE in Māru-Gurjara architecture with later additions throughout the history. The central temple has three components: Mulaprasada (central shrine) and two halls: Gudhamandapa (principal hall) and second mandapa (outer hall) which is located in a large court surrounded by shrine cells with a passage. There are several other shrines in the court.

History

Brihadswayambhustotra (dated  600 CE) by Digambara poet Samantabhadra, mentions an existence of footprints of Arishtanemi on Girnar. The temple with an idol was built later. Replacing the older structure, the oldest part of the present temple was built by Sajjana, the governor of Saurashtra, appointed by Jayasimha Siddharaja of Chaulukya dynasty, in Vikram Samvat 1145 (1129 CE). This reconstruction was first mentioned by Vijaysensuri. There are several prabandhas mentioning the reconstruction with minute variations. According to Merutunga's Prabandhachintamani, Sajjana has used three years worth of income from Saurashtra region to rebuild the temple instead of crediting it to the royal treasury. Siddharaja inquired the issue during his return from pilgrimage to Somnath temple. Sajjana had told Jains of Vanthali to raise the fund for the return. When Siddharaja visited the temple, he was told that the temple is named Karnavihara after his father Karna which pleased him and he approved the spending. There was an inscription on the stone near the south gate mentioning the word Karnayatan a century ago which is now lost. Merutunga also mentions that Sajjana had replaced the previously existing wooden temple but no other work corroborates it. According to Vijaysensuri, the amalasaraka (top of the spire) of the temple was gilded by Bhavad of Malwa around 12th century. Shanraja-shila-prashasti (Samvat 1509-10, 1453-54 CE) mentions that Chudasama king Mandalika I had gilded the temple with gold plates. Harpal Shah of Khambhat had renovated the temple in Samvat 1449 (1393 CE) on the instruction of Jayatilaksuri of Brihat-Tapa-Gaccha.

Architecture 

The central Neminath temple is built in Māru-Gurjara architecture (Solaṅkī style). It is west-facing and built from black-grey granite. The central temple has three components; Mulaprasada (central shrine) and two halls: Gudhamandapa (principal hall) and second mandapa (outer hall).

The Mulprasada is of sandhara style, the sanctum having a circumambulatory passage (pradakshina) around it. The exterior of the temple is sparsely carved. It contains a large black image of Neminath sitting in the lotus position holding a conch in his palm. The circumambulatory passage has many images in white marble including that of a Ganesha and a chovishi or slab of the 24 Tirthankara. 

The Gudhamandapa (principal hall) in front of the Mulaprasada measures across from door to door inside 41' 7" x 44' 7" from the shrine door to that leading out at the west end. The roof is supported by 22 square columns of granite coated with white lime and covered in marble. There are vestibules on north and south leading to gates and east leading to sanctum. The ceiling is of about 15 feet in diametre with carved black stone in multiple layers with 16 images. The exterior of the Gudhamandapa is also simple and sparsely carved. The floor is of tessellated marble. The niches in the walls of the Gudhamandapa has idols of Hemachandra, Kumarapala and Shantisuri of Kunjarapadriya Gaccha (dated VS 1275/1219 CE). On the pillars of the Gudhamandapa, there are inscriptions dated VS 1333 (1278 CE), VS 1335 (1280 CE), and VS 1339 (1284 CE); all related to various donations. According to Jinharshagani, the toranas on three gates of mandapa were added by Vastupala which still exists. There are two shrines between the Gudhamandapa and mandapa.

A new second mandapa (outer hall) was added to the west of the Gudhamandapa in 17th century in place of previously existing pau-mandapa. The mandapa measures 38' x 21' 3". It houses two small raised platforms paved with slabs of yellow stone, covered with representations of feet in pairs called padukas, which represent the feet of the 420 Ganadharas, first disciples of Tirthankaras. These platforms were raised in Samvat 1694 (1628 CE). On the west of mandapa, there is a closed west entrance with a porch overhanging the perpendicular scarp of the hill.

The court is surrounded inside by 67 shrine cells, each enshrining a marble image on a bench, with a covered passage running round in front of them. The principal east entrance was closed in or after 19th century and converted into a room where idols are installed. The south and north entrances are located between the series of shrine cells. The passage in front shrine cells were built in Samvat 1215 (1159 CE) according to the inscription in north entrance. Two pattas are installed in the passage: nandishwardwipa patta (dated Samvat 1287, 1231 CE) on west side and samet shikhar patta (identified as vis viharman patta) on north side.

There is a small temple of Adinatha behind the Neminath temple facing west which was built by Jagmal Gordhan of Porwad family in 1792 CE (VS 1848) under guidance of Jinendra Suri. There is a shrine of Rajimati next to it which was built in later period. There are few shrines in the court dedicated to Jain monks. The shrine dedicated to Ambika near south porch of the Gudhamandapa is a later addition as it is not mentioned in medieval literature.

On south side, there is a shrine with a large cellar historically known as Papamadhi. It has a large white marble image of Amijhara Parshwanatha along with idols of Neminath, Rathnemi and another Neminath installed by Jinchandrasuri of Kharatara Gaccha in Samvat 1358 (1302 CE). The first mention of Amijhara Parshwanatha is found in Tirthamala by Sheelvijay of Tapa Gaccha dated to 17th century. It is not mention in any works from 8th to 16th century.

References

Bibliography 
  
 
 
 
  

Tourism in Gujarat
Jain temples in Gujarat
Jain pilgrimage sites
Tourist attractions in Junagadh district
12th-century Jain temples
Māru-Gurjara architecture